The 1960 Harvard Crimson football team was an American football team that represented Harvard University during the 1960 NCAA University Division football season. Harvard tied for third in the Ivy League.

In their fourth year under head coach John Yovicsin, the Crimson compiled a 5–4 record but were outscored 119 to 90. Terry F. Lenzner was the team captain.

Harvard's 4–3 conference record tied for third-best in the Ivy League standings. The Crimson were outscored 86 to 65 by Ivy opponents. 

Harvard played its home games at Harvard Stadium in the Allston neighborhood of Boston, Massachusetts.

Schedule

References

Harvard
Harvard Crimson football seasons
Harvard Crimson football
1960s in Boston